The International Giovanni Sacchi Landriani Prize is awarded every two years by the Istituto Lombardo, Accademia di Scienze e Lettere to recognize important original contributions to the field of numerical methods for partial differential equations during the preceding five years. The prize, first awarded in 1991, honors numerical analyst Giovanni Sacchi Landriani, who died in 1989 at age 31.

Recipients 
The recipients of the International Giovanni Sacchi Landriani Prize are:

 2007:  Alessandro Veneziani
 2005:  Barbara Wohlmuth
 2003:  Claude Le Bris
 1997:  Benoît Perthame
 1995:  Anthony T. Patera
 1993:  Ricardo H. Nochetto
 1991:  Douglas N. Arnold

See also

 List of mathematics awards

References 

Mathematics awards
Awards established in 1991
1991 establishments in Italy
Italian awards